Agrostis (bent or bentgrass) is a large and very nearly cosmopolitan genus of plants in the grass family, found in nearly all the countries in the world. It has been bred as a GMO creeping bent grass.

Species

 Agrostis aequivalvi (Arctic bent)
 Agrostis agrostiflora 
 Agrostis alpina 
 Agrostis ambatoensis 
 Agrostis × amurensis 
 Agrostis anadyrensis 
 Agrostis angrenica
 Agrostis arvensis 
 Agrostis atlantica 
 Agrostis australiensis 
 Agrostis bacillata 
 Agrostis balansae 
 Agrostis barceloi 
 Agrostis basalis 
 Agrostis bergiana 
 Agrostis bettyae 
 Agrostis × bjoerkmannii 
 Agrostis blasdalei 
 Agrostis boliviana 
 Agrostis boormanii 
 Agrostis bourgaei
 Agrostis boyacensis 
 Agrostis brachiata 
 Agrostis brachyathera 
 Agrostis breviculmis 
 Agrostis burmanica 
 Agrostis calderoniae 
 Agrostis canina (velvet bent)
 Agrostis capillaris (common bent, browntop)
 Agrostis carmichaelii 
 Agrostis castellana (highland bent)
 Agrostis × castriferrei 
 Agrostis clavata (northern bent)
 Agrostis × clavatiformis 
 Agrostis clemensorum 
 Agrostis comorensis
 Agrostis congestiflora 
 Agrostis continuata 
 Agrostis curtisii (bristle bent)
 Agrostis cypricola
 Agrostis decaryana
 Agrostis delicatula 
 Agrostis delislei 
 Agrostis densiflora (California bent)
 Agrostis diemenica
 Agrostis dimorpholemma 
 Agrostis divaricatissima 
 Agrostis dshungarica
 Agrostis durieui 
 Agrostis dyeri 
 Agrostis elliotii 
 Agrostis elliottiana
 Agrostis emirnensis 
 Agrostis eriantha 
 Agrostis exarata (spike bent)
 Agrostis exserta 
 Agrostis filipes 
 Agrostis flaccida 
 Agrostis foliata 
 Agrostis × fouilladeana 
 Agrostis gelida 
 Agrostis ghiesbreghtii 
 Agrostis gigantea (black bent, redtop)
 Agrostis × gigantifera 
 Agrostis glabra
 Agrostis goughensis
 Agrostis gracilifolia
 Agrostis gracililaxa 
 Agrostis griffithiana
 Agrostis hallii
 Agrostis × hegetschweileri 
 Agrostis hendersonii 
 Agrostis hesperica 
 Agrostis hideoi 
 Agrostis hirta 
 Agrostis holgateana 
 Agrostis hookeriana
 Agrostis hooveri 
 Agrostis howellii 
 Agrostis hugoniana 
 Agrostis humbertii
 Agrostis humilis 
 Agrostis hyemalis (winter bent)
 Agrostis hygrometrica 
 Agrostis idahoensis 
 Agrostis imbecilla 
 Agrostis imberbis 
 Agrostis inaequiglumis 
 Agrostis inconspicua 
 Agrostis infirma 
 Agrostis innominata 
 Agrostis insularis 
 Agrostis isopholis 
 Agrostis jahnii 
 Agrostis joyceae 
 Agrostis juressii 
 Agrostis keniensis 
 Agrostis kilimandscharica 
 Agrostis koelerioides 
 Agrostis kolymensis 
 Agrostis korczaginii 
 Agrostis lacuna-vernalis 
 Agrostis laxissima 
 Agrostis lazica 
 Agrostis lehmannii 
 Agrostis lenis 
 Agrostis leptotricha 
 Agrostis liebmannii
 Agrostis longiberbis 
 Agrostis mackliniae 
 Agrostis magellanica
 Agrostis mannii
 Agrostis marojejyensis
 Agrostis masafuerana 
 Agrostis media
 Agrostis mertensii (Arctic bent)
 Agrostis merxmuelleri 
 Agrostis meyenii 
 Agrostis micrantha 
 Agrostis microphylla
 Agrostis montevidensis 
 Agrostis muelleriana 
 Agrostis munroana 
 Agrostis × murbeckii 
 Agrostis muscosa 
 Agrostis musjidii 
 Agrostis nebulosa 
 Agrostis nervosa 
 Agrostis nevadensis 
 Agrostis nevskii 
 Agrostis nipponensis 
 Agrostis novogaliciana 
 Agrostis × novograblenovii 
 Agrostis olympica 
 Agrostis oregonensis 
 Agrostis oresbia 
 Agrostis pallens (dune bent, seashore bent)
 Agrostis pallescens 
 Agrostis × paramushirensis 
 Agrostis parviflora
 Agrostis paulsenii 
 Agrostis peninsularis 
 Agrostis perennans (upland bent)
 Agrostis personata 
 Agrostis peschkovae 
 Agrostis petriei 
 Agrostis philippiana 
 Agrostis pilgeriana 
 Agrostis pilosula 
 Agrostis pittieri 
 Agrostis platensis 
 Agrostis pleiophylla 
 Agrostis pourretii 
 Agrostis producta 
 Agrostis propinqua 
 Agrostis quinqueseta 
 Agrostis reuteri 
 Agrostis rosei 
 Agrostis rossiae 
 Agrostis rupestris 
 Agrostis salaziensis 
 Agrostis salsa 
 Agrostis sandwicensis 
 Agrostis × sanionis 
 Agrostis scabra (rough bent, tickle bent)
 Agrostis scabrifolia 
 Agrostis schaffneri
 Agrostis schleicheri 
 Agrostis schmidii
 Agrostis sclerophylla 
 Agrostis serranoi 
 Agrostis sesquiflora
 Agrostis sichotensis 
 Agrostis sikkimensis 
 Agrostis sinocontracta 
 Agrostis sinorupestris 
 Agrostis × stebleri 
 Agrostis stolonifera (creeping bent) 
 Agrostis × subclavata 
 Agrostis subpatens 
 Agrostis subrepens 
 Agrostis subulata 
 Agrostis subulifolia 
 Agrostis tandilensis (Kennedy's bent)
 Agrostis tateyamensis 
 Agrostis taylorii 
 Agrostis tenerrima 
 Agrostis thompsoniae
 Agrostis thurberiana 
 Agrostis tibestica 
 Agrostis tileni
 Agrostis tolucensis 
 Agrostis × torgesii 
 Agrostis trachychlaena
 Agrostis trachyphylla 
 Agrostis trichodes 
 Agrostis trisetoides 
 Agrostis tsaratananensis
 Agrostis tsiafajavonensis
 Agrostis tsitondroinensis 
 Agrostis turrialbae 
 Agrostis tuvinica
 Agrostis uhligii
 Agrostis uliginosa 
 Agrostis umbellata 
 Agrostis ushae 
 Agrostis × ussuriensis 
 Agrostis variabilis (mountain bent)
 Agrostis venezuelana
 Agrostis venusta
 Agrostis vidalii 
 Agrostis vinealis (brown bent)
 Agrostis virescens 
 Agrostis volkensii 
 Agrostis wacei
 Agrostis zenkeri 

Hundreds of species formerly listed in the genus Agrostis have been moved to other genera, including Achnatherum, Aira, Alloteropsis, Apera, Arundinella, Calamagrostis, Chaetopogon, Chionochloa, Chloris, Cinna, Colpodium, Crypsis, Cynodon, Deschampsia, Dichelachne, Digitaria, Eremochloa, Eriochloa, Eustachys, Gastridium, Graphephorum, Gymnopogon, Lachnagrostis, Leptochloa, Muhlenbergia, Pentameris, Phippsia, Piptatherum, Poa, Polypogon, Puccinellia, Reimarochloa, Relchela, Schismus, Sporobolus and  Zingeria.

Uses
Some species of bents are commonly used for lawn grass. This is a desirable grass for golf course teeing areas, fairways, and greens.

Bentgrass is used in turf applications for its numerous advantages:  it can be mowed to a very short length without damage, it can handle a great amount of foot traffic, it has a shallow root system that is thick and dense allowing it to be seeded and grow rather easily, and it has a pleasing, deep green appearance.  The name "bent" refers to the shallow roots, which bend just below the surface of the soil to propagate laterally.

Creeping bent
Agrostis stolonifera is the most commonly used species of Agrostis. Historically, it was often called Orcheston long grass, after a village on Salisbury Plain, England. It is cultivated almost exclusively on golf courses, especially on putting greens. Creeping bent aggressively produces horizontal stems, called stolons, that run along the soil's surface.  These allow creeping bent to form dense stands under conducive conditions and outcompete bunch-type grass and broadleaf weeds. As such, if infested in a home lawn, it can become a troublesome weed problem. The leaves of the bentgrass are long and slender. It can quickly take over a home lawn if it is not controlled and has very shallow roots.

The Scotts Miracle-Gro Company and Monsanto genetically engineered creeping bent to be glyphosate-tolerant under Monsanto's Roundup Ready trademark, as "one of the first wind-pollinated, perennial, and highly outcrossing transgenic crops". In 2003, Scotts planted it as part of a large (about 160 ha) field trial in central Oregon near Madras. In 2004, its pollen was found to have reached wild growing bentgrass populations up to 14 kilometres away. Cross-pollinating Agrostis gigantea was even found at a distance of 21 kilometres. Scotts could not remove all genetically engineered plants and in 2007, the Animal and Plant Health Inspection Service fined them $500,000 for non-compliance with Plant Protection Act regulations.

Common bent
Agrostis capillaris, or colonial bent, was brought to America from Europe.  This was the type of grass that was used on the lawns of most estates.   It is the tallest of the bents with very fine texture and like most bent grasses grows very densely.  Although this species has been used on golf courses and sporting fields it is better suited for lawns.  Colonial bent is fairly easy to grow from seeds and fertilization of the lawn is not as intense.  This grass also takes longer to establish than creeping bent.  However it does not require the intense maintenance.

Velvet bent
Agrostis canina gets its name for the velvet appearance that this grass produces.  It has the finest texture of all the bent grasses.  This grass was used in Europe for estate lawns and golf courses because it could be cut so short. Velvet bent grass requires similar upkeep and maintenance to creeping bent. Velvet bent has recently had a resurgence in the UK due to the high demands on greens from inclement weather and speed expectations. This species also has a lighter color than the two previous species.

Butterfly food plant
Butterflies whose caterpillars feed on Agrostis include:
 Zabulon skipper, Poanes zabulon

See also
 Dollar spot
 List of Poaceae genera

References

External links
 Interactive Key to Agrostis of North America

 
Lawn grasses
Poaceae genera
Taxa named by Carl Linnaeus